Fusconaia subrotunda, the long solid mussel or long solid naiad, is a species of freshwater mussel, an aquatic bivalve mollusk in the family Unionidae.

This mussel, sometimes called a pigtoe, is found in river gravel.  Young mussels are light brown, but darken to nearly black with age.

This species is found in Canada and the United States.

Subspecies 
 Fusconaia subrotunda kirklandiana
 Fusconaia subrotunda lesueriana Lea
 Fusconaia subrotunda pilaris Lea 
 Fusconaia subrotunda subrotunda

References

External links
 long solid mussel
  ITIS

subrotunda
Bivalves described in 1831
Taxonomy articles created by Polbot